This is a list of Marathi films that have been released or have been scheduled for release 2015.

January–March

April–June

July–September

October–December

References

External links
http://www.gomolo.com/2010-2019/marathi-movies-2015

Lists of 2015 films by country or language
2015 in Indian cinema
2015